Carabalí is a surname. Notable people with the surname include:

Adriana Carabalí, Colombian politician
Francisco Carabalí (born 1991), Venezuelan footballer
Héctor Carabalí (born 1972), Ecuadorian footballer and manager
José Carabalí (athlete) (born 1970), Venezuelan runner
José Carabalí (footballer) (born 1997), Ecuadorian football player
Norfalia Carabalí (born 1964), Colombian sprinter
Wilson Carabalí (born 1972), Ecuadorian footballer